Lily Sacofsky (born 1994) is an English actress. She is known for her roles in the BBC Two miniseries Summer of Rockets (2019), the ITV period drama Sanditon (2019–), and the crime drama McDonald & Dodds (2020–2021), also on ITV.

Early life
Sacofsky was born in Manchester to parents Ruth, from a Midlands coal-mining family, and Julian, from a Northern England Jewish family. She graduated with a Bachelor of Arts in Acting from the Guildhall School of Music and Drama in 2015.

Filmography

Stage

References

External links
 

Living people
1994 births
Actresses from Manchester
Alumni of the Guildhall School of Music and Drama
Jewish English actresses